Pelinobius or the king baboon is a monotypic genus of east African tarantulas containing the single species, Pelinobius muticus. It was first described by Ferdinand Anton Franz Karsch in 1885, and is found in Tanzania and Kenya.

Description
The king baboon spider is rusty brown to orange in color. They live in the shrublands and grasslands of east Africa, often using vegetation as a protective cover for their burrows. They are one of the few tarantulas that use stridulation as a major defense mechanism in addition to rearing up and striking. They produce the stridulation sound effect by rubbing the femurs of their first and second pairs of legs.

They are burrowing spiders with thick back legs used for digging. They generally hunt beetles, cockroaches, and other spiders, and they will put silk near the entrance to its burrow to detect vibrations of passing prey.

In captivity
They are popular among collectors, but they tend to be highly defensive, lacking urticating hairs, and are not suitable for beginners. They have very strong venom, though none are known to be deadly to humans. A bite from a smaller spider will cause sharp pain and localized itchiness for five days.

Younger spiders can be kept in small containers, such as pill tubs and waxworm tubs, but will need deeper containers as they grow.

See also
 List of Theraphosidae species

References

External links

Fauna of East Africa
Monotypic Mygalomorphae genera
Spiders of Africa
Taxa named by Ferdinand Karsch
Theraphosidae